Yunus Sentamu (born 13 August 1994) is a Ugandan professional footballer who plays as a forward.

Club career

Ilves
In July 2016, Sentamu was cleared to play for FC Ilves in the Veikkausliiga following the resolution of visa problems, having originally signed an agreement in January 2016.

Tirana
On 19 June 2017, Sentamu completed a transfer to Tirana in the Albanian First Division. He made his debut in the first leg 2017–18 UEFA Europa League first qualifying round against Maccabi Tel Aviv as Tirana lost 2–0. He also played in the returning leg at Selman Stërmasi Stadium, receiving a red-card for a foul as Tirana lost 3–0, and was eliminated 5–0 on aggregate.

Sentamu captained Tirana for the first time on 25 November in the 1–1 draw against Shënkolli in the championship matchday 9. However, club's decision to make him captain for the match was heavily contested by fans. Manager Zé Maria defended his choice and also praised Sentamu, calling him "an example for everyone". He scored his first hat-trick of the season on 17 December in the 6–0 thrashing of Pogradeci valid for the matchday 11. In the last match of 2017, Sentamu won a penalty which was scored by Karabeci and himself netted the third in a 0–4 win at Naftëtari Kuçovë to become the first Tirana player to reach double-figures in the 2017–18 season.

Sentamu concluded his first season in Albania by scoring 12 goals in 19 league appearances as Tirana was crowned Albanian First Division champion after defeating Kastrioti Krujë on 16 May 2018.

Sentamu re-joined Vipers SC on 28 January 2021 and signed with the Kitende based Club for a period of two years. He was unveiled by Vipers SC coach Fred Kajoba at the St. Mary's Kitende for the 2020/21 Uganda Premier League.

Career statistics

International

International goals

Honours
AS Vita Club
 CAF Champions League: Runner-up 2014

Tirana
 Albanian First Division: 2017–18
 Albanian Supercup: 2017

References

External links
 

1994 births
Living people
Ugandan footballers
Association football forwards
Uganda international footballers
Ugandan expatriate footballers
Expatriate footballers in Tunisia
Expatriate footballers in Albania
CS Sfaxien players
KF Tirana players
Kategoria e Parë players
AS Vita Club players
2017 Africa Cup of Nations players
Ugandan expatriate sportspeople in Albania
Ugandan expatriate sportspeople in Tunisia
People from Kasese District
Uganda A' international footballers
2014 African Nations Championship players